Sankt Marein may refer to the following places:

Austria

Sankt Marein bei Graz, in Styria
Sankt Marein bei Knittelfeld, in Styria
Sankt Marein bei Neumarkt, in Styria
Sankt Marein im Mürztal, in Styria

Slovenia

 Šmarje pri Jelšah, in Lower Styria (in German: Sankt Marein bei Erlachstein)